PS Kathleen Mavourneen was a paddle steamer passenger vessel operated by the Drogheda Steam Packet Company from 1855 to 1902 and the  Lancashire and Yorkshire Railway from 1902 to 1903.

History

She was built by A. Jack and Co of Seacombe for the Drogheda Steam Packet Company for service between Drogheda and Liverpool. Ownership of the steamer was transferred to the Lancashire and Yorkshire Railway in 1902 when they took over the business of the Drogheda company. Upon the delivery of the new screw steamers Colleen Bawn and Mellifont in 1903, the Kathleen Mavourneen was withdrawn from service and soon after sold and scrapped in the Netherlands.

References

1885 ships
Passenger ships of the United Kingdom
Steamships
Ships built on the River Mersey
Ships of the London and North Western Railway
Ships of the Lancashire and Yorkshire Railway
Paddle steamers of the United Kingdom